A Taste of Bublé is an EP by Canadian artist Michael Bublé, released in the United States on April 29, 2008. The EP was made available as a digital download, and was also available exclusively on CD via Best Buy stores. The EP features tracks from two of Bublé's albums, It's Time and Call Me Irresponsible, a track from his 2006 EP With Love, and a new remix of the track "Everything".

Track listing

Release history

References 

Michael Bublé albums
2008 EPs
Reprise Records EPs